The Gwinnett County Public Library is located in unincorporated Gwinnett County, Georgia, United States, northeast of Atlanta. The library currently has 15 branches throughout the county and employs an interlibrary loan system for those with a valid library card.

In 2000 the Gwinnett County Public Library won the Library of the Year award. In 2009 it also won the John Cotton Dana Award, which is the most prestigious of all library awards in the field of public relations and marketing. This library system has also achieved the highest amounts of material circulation out of all libraries in Georgia.

History 

The first library in the Gwinnett County region was the Norcross library, established in 1907 by the Norcross Woman's Club. Following this, in 1935, the Lawrenceville PTA began the Lawrenceville Public Library in City Hall, which was renamed to the Gwinnett County Library the following year.

In 1956, in an effort to consolidate resources with nearby Forsyth County, the two library systems agreed to form a joint venture named the Gwinnett-Forsyth Regional Library. During this time Gwinnett County opened the Lake Lanier Regional Library in Buford, and libraries in Snellville and Mountain Park.

As the Atlanta metropolitan region began to fill out, Gwinnett and the surrounding counties saw a huge influx of residents, and therefore a much greater need to expand their library services. In 1986 a bond referendum allowed for each of the seven existing branches to be updated, and also allocated funds for the construction of an eighth branch at Peachtree Corners. Following suit not long after, Forsyth County received monies to refurbish their libraries and add a location of their own.

With the increasing amount of branches in the Gwinnett-Forsyth Regional Library System, Gwinnett County opted to dissolve the venture in 1996. It is at this point the Gwinnett County Public Library was formed.

In 1999, the GCPL's tenth branch opened at Collins Hill. It was also named a finalist for the Library of the Year award. In 2000 the library system was again among finalists for library of the year, and at this point won.

In 2002 the Centerville branch opened, sharing facilities with the adjacent Gwinnett County community center. A twelfth branch opened in Suwanne in 2004, and yet another in Dacula in 2006.

In 2005 the Grayson branch was opened, and in 2010 the Hamilton Mill branch opened as a LEED Gold certified building.

Censorship controversy 

In 1997, Gwinnett County Public Library removed Nancy Friday's bestseller Women On Top from its collection after two patrons complained about its sexual content. Connie Cosby, one of the patrons, had requested that the book be made unavailable to children, and was "stunned" but "ecstatic" that library director Jo Ann Pinder removed it entirely. Women On Top became the fourth book Gwinnett County Public Library had removed from its shelves because of complaints about content.

The library's decision prompted many residents to write letters opposing and supporting the library's decision; one such letter from Sheila Blahnik, the other patron who had asked the library to remove Women On Top, called the reaction an "onslaught of media attention". Area booksellers reported increased sales of the book soon after the library removed it; a Waldenbooks manager said, "In two months the bookstore sold one copy, and all of a sudden last week we sold eight." One county resident called for Pinder and another librarian to be fired for describing the reasons for the book's removal as "editing errors and changes in library purchasing guidelines" rather than stating that it was censored because of its sexual content; other residents began shouting questions which the board did not answer, and the police were summoned.

As a result of the controversy, Gwinnett County Public Library created a "parental advisory" category for books deemed suitable only for adults, allowing parents to give consent for their minor children to check those items out. The library also created an advisory board to review the process for handling residents' complaints about library materials, and on the advice of county lawyers the library later opened those meetings to the public. Ultimately, the library made it easier to request removing books from the library, on the advice of the advisory board, because the old form had been "too complicated".

The current Materials Management Policy (last updated 2016), has eliminated restricted item sections or categories and instead encourages customers to make their own decisions on which materials to check out.  In line with current American Library Association guidelines on censorship, the Gwinnett County Public Library's current policy states that one customer "may not restrict access to these materials by others".  A materials reconsideration request form is available for customers who which to challenge materials held by the library.

Branches

Library systems in neighboring counties
 Forsyth County Public Library to the north
 Hall County Library System to the northeast
 Azalea Regional Library System to the east
 Conyers-Rockdale Library System to the south
 DeKalb County Public Library to the southwest
 Atlanta-Fulton Public Library System to the west

References

External links
 

Public libraries in Georgia (U.S. state)
Education in Gwinnett County, Georgia
Buildings and structures in Gwinnett County, Georgia
County library systems in Georgia (U.S. state)